Chunghee Sarah Soh or Sarah Soh is an American professor of Anthropology at San Francisco State University. She is a sociocultural anthropologist who specializes in issues of women, gender, sexuality.

Her book The Comfort Women: Sexual Violence and Postcolonial Memory in Korea and Japan delivers new insight into the nature of the comfort women issue.

Careers
She graduated from Sogang University in Seoul and earned master's degree and then Ph.D from the University of Hawaii in 1987. She taught cultural anthropology at universities in Hawaii in 1990, Arizona from 1990-1991 and Texas from 1991–94. She joined San Francisco State University in 1994.

Comfort women
Soh has said "there can be no denial of the tragic victimization of forcibly recruited women who suffered slavery-like conditions." According to Soh, "it was Japan's colonialism that undoubtedly facilitated the large-scale victimization of tens of thousands of Korean women".

She wrote a book titled The Comfort Women: Sexual Violence and Postcolonial Memory in Korea and Japan. In the book, she provocatively disputes the simplistic view that comfort women were victims of a war crime were solely the fault of Imperial Japan. Instead, she argues that both the Japanese military and the Korean patriarchy are at fault. She asserts that because of the patriarchy that dominated Korea at the time, homes were unstable and thus young girls were more likely to leave, a situation which allowed comfort station owners to recruit them into brothels. Additionally, she argues South Korean nationalist politics and the international women's human rights movement have contributed to the incomplete view of the tragedy that still dominates today.

Works

See also
An Byeong-jik
Lee Young-hoon
Park Yu-ha
Diary of a Japanese military brothel manager

References

External links
 Home page
 Book review
 Pages 10-11 of her book 'The Comfort Women'

Living people
South Korean academics
San Francisco State University faculty
American anthropologists
Sogang University alumni
University of Hawaiʻi alumni
American women anthropologists
South Korean women anthropologists
Year of birth missing (living people)